The second HMS Vega was a V-class destroyer of the British Royal Navy that saw service in World War I and World War II.

Construction and commissioning

Vega was ordered on 30 June 1916 as part of the 9th Order of the 1916–17 Naval Programme. She was laid down on 11 December 1916 by William Doxford & Sons at Sunderland, England, and launched on 1 September 1917. She was completed on 12 December 1917 and commissioned into service on 14 December 1917. Her original pennant number, F4A, was changed to F92 in January 1918 and to F09 in April 1918. It became D52 during the interwar period.

Service history

World War I
Vega was assigned to the Grand Fleet or Harwich Force and saw service in the last year of World War I, suffering damage while operating with the fleet in 1918.

Interwar years
Vega was among the ships which accompanied the battlecruisers  and  during their visit to Scandinavian ports in June 1920. During the voyage, she and the destroyer  tested the Royal Navys High Speed Mine Sweep, which the British Admiralty hoped to use in the shallow waters of the Baltic in the event of a war with Bolshevik Russia (soon to become the Soviet Union). In a blow to the Admiraltys plans, both destroyers lost their minesweeping apparatus, demonstrating the High Speed Mine Sweep to be impractical in shallow water.

In 1921, Vega was part of the 6th Destroyer Flotilla, assigned to the Atlantic Fleet. She later was placed in reserve and assigned to the Reserve Fleet.

Under the 1939 Rearmament Programme, Vega was selected for conversion to an antiaircraft escort. In May 1939, she entered Chatham Dockyard to begin conversion.

World War II

1939–1941
Vega was still undergoing conversion when the United Kingdom entered World War II in September 1939, but in October 1939 she underwent her post-conversion acceptance trials and was selected for service escorting convoys in the North Sea. She reported to the Rosyth Escort Force in Scotland in November 1939 and began convoy duty in December 1939. Her pennant number became L41 when she reentered service in 1939.

In May 1940, Vega was detached from her normal duties for operations in the English Channel related to requirements to evacuate Allied troops from Belgium and France and prevent the use of French ports by German forces, and she assisted in the evacuation of troops from Ostend and Zeebrugge, Belgium. On 26 May 1940, she served as the flagship for Operation Lyster, the sinking of two blockships at Zeebrugge. The following day, she joined the Polish Navy destroyer  in a night reconnaissance of the harbor at Dunkirk, France, to determine whether Allied troops could be evacuated there; although two German aircraft attacked them and there were many wrecks in the harbor, they found it navigable, and the Royal Navy decided to send ships there to evacuate troops. On 10 June 1940 she escorted blockships to Dieppe, France, and, after they sank themselves to block the harbor there, supported the evacuation of Allied personnel from Le Havre, France. On 17 June 1940, she deployed to support Operation Aerial, the evacuation of Allied personnel from Saint-Nazaire, France, and other French ports on the Bay of Biscay.

In July 1940, Vega returned to convoy duty in the North Sea. This came to an end on 11 November 1940, when she struck a naval mine off Sunk Head, Harwich, England, and suffered heavy damage. While still under repair in December 1941, she was "adopted" by the civil community of Godalming, Surrey, in a Warship Week fundraising campaign.

1942–1945

Vegas repairs were not completed until 14 November 1942. She emerged from them with Type 285 fire-control radar installed for her main guns, as well as a Type 286 air search radar to warn of the approach of aircraft. She returned to her convoy escort duties in the North Sea for the rest of World War II, and later had a Type 271 radar installed for the detection of submarines and motor torpedo boats. In 1943 she had radio telephone equipment installed to allow her to communicate with Royal Air Force aircraft during combat against German aircraft and S-boats (the motor torpedo boats known to the Allies as "E-boats"), as well as "Headache" (also known as "Y Outfit") radio receivers for the interception of E-boat communications.

After the surrender of Germany in early May 1945, Vega operated in support of Allied reoccupation forces in Europe during the summer of 1945.

Decommissioning and disposal

After the armistice with Japan brought World War II to an end on 15 August 1945, Vega was decommissioned and placed in reserve. She was sold on 4 March 1947 to BISCO for scrapping by Clayton and Davies at Dunston on Tyne and arrived at the shipbreakers yard on 26 March 1947.

Notes

Bibliography

External links
 Naval History: SHIPS OF THE ROYAL NAVY, 1914–1919 – in ALPHABETICAL ORDER (Part 2 of 2)
 HMS VEGA (L 41) – V & W-class Destroyer
 uboat.net HMS Vega (L 41)

 

V and W-class destroyers of the Royal Navy
Ships built on the River Wear
1917 ships
World War I destroyers of the United Kingdom
World War II destroyers of the United Kingdom